Jackson is a town in Aiken County, South Carolina, United States. The population was 1,700 at the 2010 census. It is part of the Augusta, Georgia metropolitan area.

History
Silver Bluff was listed on the National Register of Historic Places in 1977.

Geography
It is the closest community northwest of the U.S. Department of Energy Savannah River Site.

Demographics

2020 census

As of the 2020 United States census, there were 1,521 people, 791 households, and 531 families residing in the town.

2000 census
As of the census of 2000, there were 1,625 people, 677 households, and 469 families residing in the town. The racial makeup of the town was 88.62% White, 8.98% African American, 1.11% Native American, 0.31% Asian, 0.06% Pacific Islander, 0.18% from other races, and 0.74% from two or more races. Hispanic or Latino of any race were 1.23% of the population.

There were 677 households, out of which 28.7% had children under the age of 18 living with them, 55.1% were married couples living together, 10.9% had a female householder with no husband present, and 30.6% were non-families. 28.7% of all households were made up of individuals, and 11.7% had someone living alone who was 65 years of age or older. The average household size was 2.40 and the average family size was 2.93.

In the town, the population was spread out, with 24.6% under the age of 18, 6.9% from 18 to 24, 28.1% from 25 to 44, 22.0% from 45 to 64, and 18.5% who were 65 years of age or older. The median age was 40 years. For every 100 females, there were 94.4 males. For every 100 females age 18 and over, there were 86.3 males.

The median income for a household in the town was $35,924, and the median income for a family was $41,563. Males had a median income of $38,458 versus $24,732 for females. The per capita income for the town was $17,357. About 8.8% of families and 11.1% of the population were below the poverty line, including 21.6% of those under age 18 and 1.9% of those age 65 or over.

Education
Jackson has a public library, a branch of the ABBE Regional Library System.

References

External links
Town of Jackson official website

Towns in Aiken County, South Carolina
Towns in South Carolina
Augusta metropolitan area